Victor Johnovich Keyru (alternate spelling: Viktor Keirou) (born January 31, 1984) is a Russian former professional basketball player. He represented the Russian national basketball team.

Professional career
Keyru joined CSKA Moscow in June 2008. In July 2010 he signed with Dynamo Moscow.

National team career
Keyru has also been a member of the senior Russian national basketball team. He competed with Russia at the 2008 Olympics Basketball Tournament.

Personal
His father John Carew is from Sierra Leone (he represented his country in 100m competition at the 1980 Olympics) and his mother is Ukrainian.
His sister Katerina Keyru played for Russia's women's Under-21 national basketball team.
His brother Olah Keyru (Ола Кейру) is a famous TV-series actor on MTV Russia.

References

External links
 Eurobasket.com Profile
 Euroleague.net Profile
 VTB League Profile

1984 births
Living people
Basketball players at the 2008 Summer Olympics
BC Dynamo Moscow players
BC Dynamo Saint Petersburg players
BC Krasnye Krylia players
BC Spartak Primorye players
BC Spartak Saint Petersburg players
BC UNICS players
Olympic basketball players of Russia
PBC CSKA Moscow players
Sportspeople from Rostov-on-Don
Russian men's basketball players
Russian people of Sierra Leonean descent
Russian people of Ukrainian descent
Shooting guards
Small forwards